Mother Teresa Women's University, a state university of the Government of Tamil Nadu, is situated at Kodaikanal, in the Palani hills of South India. It was established in the year 1984 by the enactment of Tamil Nadu Act 15. This university aims to extend its service to women students of all communities. It strives for Academic Excellence and Personality Development and gives equal importance for promotion of employment prospects to young girls. It monitors and offers consultancy services and research in Women's Studies.

The university offers distance education courses. The School of Distance Education of Mother Teresa Women's University was started in 1988 at Kodaikanal.

Courses
These courses are open to women candidates only

PG - Science Courses 
M.Sc. Computer Science, M.Sc. Mathematics, M.Sc. Visual Communication, M.Sc. Foods & Nutrition, M.Sc. Textiles & Clothing, MCA, M.Sc Biotechnology, M.Sc Botany, M.Sc Chemistry, M.Sc Physics(Specialization in Astro Physics/Material Science), M.Sc Guidance and Counseling, M.Lib.I.Sc.

PG - Arts Courses
MBA (Tourism), M.Com, M.A. Tamil Studies, M.A. English, M.A. Historical Studies, M.A. Mass Communication and Journalism, M.A. Sociology, Master of Social Work,  M.A Women's Studies, MBA, M.A. Public Administration.

Education
M.Ed, B.Ed(Special Education, M.Ed(Special Education)

5 Years Integrated Programmes
M.Sc Computer Science(Specialization in Data Science), M.Com, M.Sc Biotechnology, M.A Sociology

B.Ed(Regular)

(Women’s University College of Education, Kodaikanal)

PG Diploma Courses
Counselling,  Women's Studies,  IPR (Intellectual Property Rights), Human Rights Education, Entrepreneurship Development, Event Management, Computer Applications, Professional Ethics, Yoga for Human Excellence, Fuzzy Hyper Graphs, Gandhian Thought.

Mother Teresa Women's University-M.Phil Regular
English,   Tamil Studies , Management,  Mathematics, Computer Science, Women’s  Studies, Commerce, Textiles and Clothing,     Foods and Nutrition, Chemistry, Sociology, Mass Communication, Guidance and Counselling, Tourism Management, Historical Studies, Biotechnology, Botany, Physics, Visual Communication, Education, Special  Education.

Mother Teresa Women's University-M.Phil Part Time
English,  Tamil Studies , Management,  Economics, Mathematics, Computer Science, Women’s  Studies, Commerce, Textiles and Clothing, Foods and Nutrition, Chemistry, Sociology, Mass Communication, Tourism Management,History,  Biotechnology, Botany, Physics, Visual Communication, Education, Special  Education, Geography, Micro Biology, BioChemistry, Zoology

Affiliated Colleges-M.Phil Regular
English,  Tamil Studies , Management,  Economics, Mathematics, Computer Science, Zoology, Commerce, Chemistry, History, Physics, Geography, Biochemistry, Micro Biology

Colleges

I Constituent College
1.Women's University College of Education, Kodaikanal

II Government Colleges
1. M.V.M Govt. Arts College for Women, Dindigul 
2. Government Arts College for Women,  Nilakottai
3. Government Arts & Science College for Women, Kodaikanal

III Autonomous Colleges
1.Jeyaraj Annapackiam College for Women,  Periyakulam
2.Arulmigu Palaniandavar Arts College For Women, Palani

IV Self Financing Colleges 
1. St. Antony's College of Arts and Science for Women,  Dindigul
2. Nadar Saraswathi College of Arts and Science, Theni
3. Sri Adi Chunchanagiri Women's College, Cumbum 
4. Sakthi College of Arts and Science for Women,  Oddanchatram, Dindigul
5. Thiravium College of Arts & Science for Women, Periyakulam
6. Bon Secours Arts & Science College for Women, Dindigul

See also
Kodaikanal
Education in India
Literacy in India
List of institutions of higher education in Tamil Nadu

References

External links
Official website

Women's universities and colleges in Tamil Nadu
Education in Dindigul district
Kodaikanal
Educational institutions established in 1984
1984 establishments in Tamil Nadu
Memorials to Mother Teresa